Kaznakovka is a rural locality (a village) in Tatar-Ulkanovsky Selsoviet, Tuymazinsky District, Bashkortostan, Russia. The population was 77 as of 2010. There is 1 street.

Geography 
Kaznakovka is located 24 km northeast of Tuymazy (the district's administrative centre) by road. Tiryan-Yelga is the nearest rural locality.

References 

Rural localities in Tuymazinsky District